The 1988 Mercantile Credit Classic was the ninth edition of the professional snooker tournament which took place from 1–10 January 1988. The tournament was played at the Norbreck Castle Hotel, Blackpool, Lancashire. Steve Davis won his fifth Classic title, beating John Parrott 13–11 in the final.

Main draw

Final

Century breaks
(Including qualifying rounds)

132  Dennis Taylor
129, 106  Steve Newbury
121  Bob Chaperon
116  Steve James
116  Dave Martin
111  Joe O'Boye
107  Tony Chappel
105  Steve Davis
103, 101  John Parrott
100  Robby Foldvari
100  David Taylor

References

Classic (snooker)
Classic
Classic
Classic
Sport in Blackpool